Nordin Musampa (born 13 October 2001) is a Dutch professional footballer who plays as a defender for Groningen. He is a nephew of former Ajax player Kiki Musampa.

Club career
Musampa began his football career with Zeeburgia and Elinkwijk, for whom he played until 2014. He then moved to Almere City for two years before moving to the renowned Ajax youth academy. In 2016–17, he made four appearances for the under-17 team. In the following season he established himself in the team and scored one goal in 26 games. In 2018–29, Musampa mainly played for the under-19 team, including in the UEFA Youth League.

He made his first appearance for Jong Ajax in the second-tier Eerste Divisie as a starter in a match against Jong Utrecht on 25 March 2019. In the following season, he only played for the U19 team. However, he would sign his first professional contract with Jong Ajax in June 2020, alongside fellow talent Terrence Douglas. He grew into a starter for the team during the 2020–21 season, and scored his first professional goal against MVV on 23 October 2020.

On 22 April 2022, Musampa signed a three-year deal with Groningen, beginning in the 2022–23 season.

International career
Musampa has played for several national youth teams for the Netherlands. With the under-17 team he won the 2018 UEFA European Under-17 Championship, after beating Italy in the final.

Career statistics

Club

Notes

Honours
Netherlands U17
 UEFA European Under-17 Championship: 2018

References

External links
 

2001 births
Living people
Dutch footballers
Netherlands youth international footballers
Association football defenders
A.V.V. Zeeburgia players
USV Elinkwijk players
Almere City FC players
AFC Ajax players
Jong Ajax players
FC Groningen players
Eerste Divisie players
Dutch people of Democratic Republic of the Congo descent